Trubarevo may refer to:
 Trubarevo, Gazi Baba, North Macedonia
 Trubarevo (Ćićevac), Serbia